Dollopterus is an extinct genus of prehistoric bony fish that lived during the Anisian stage of the Middle Triassic epoch.

See also

 Prehistoric fish
 List of prehistoric bony fish

References

Middle Triassic fish
Prehistoric neopterygii
Triassic fish of Europe
Anisian life